Ølensjøen or Ølen is the administrative centre of Vindafjord municipality in Rogaland county, Norway. The village is located at the southern end of the Ølsfjorden, along the European route E134 highway, just east of the village of Ølensvåg. It is the largest urban area in the municipality.

Ølensjøen is the regional center for commerce for the inner part of the Haugalandet area. It has a secondary school, sports club, and a public swimming pool.  Norway's largest privately owned slaughterhouse, Fatland slakteri, is located in Ølensjøen. There is a large shopping center with a pharmacy and post office in Ølensjøen that serves the residents of the Etne-Vindafjord area. Ølen Church is also located in this village.

Prior to 2006, Ølensjøen was the administrative centre of the old municipality of Ølen. In 2006, the municipality was merged with Vindafjord, and the administration of the new, larger municipality of Vindafjord was moved to Ølensjøen.

References

Villages in Rogaland
Vindafjord